The Roslyn Landmark Society (also known as RLS) is a nonprofit historical society headquartered at 36 Main Street in Roslyn, New York. It serves as the historical and landmark society for the Greater Roslyn area.

Description 
The Roslyn Landmark Society was founded in 1961. It was founded by Dr. Roger Gerry and his wife, Peggy when the historic downtown of Roslyn was threatened by destruction associated with urbanization. It was created to help preserve the Roslyn area's local history and to educate locals on the area's history.

In the late 2010s, the funds needed were raised to restore the historic Roslyn Grist Mill, which is owned by Nassau County. The project, which the Roslyn Landmark Society is involved in, had been delayed for several decades, and as part of it, the property will be restored, and the Roslyn Landmark Society will use it as an education and research center. The project is ongoing as of 2021.

During the same decade, the Roslyn Landmark Society was also involved in restoring the marble horse tamers originally located at Clarence Mackay's former local estate, Harbor Hill.

In 2020, the Roslyn Landmark Society was one of the organizations involved in preventing a historic home in East Hills from being demolished.

As of 2021, the Roslyn Landmark Society's current presidents are is Howard Kroplick and John Santos. Kroplick had also served as the Town Historian of the Town of North Hempstead for 7 years until retiring from that position in 2019.

The Roslyn Landmark Society gives annual tours of selected historic properties in Roslyn. Some of the Roslyn historic properties protected by the Roslyn Landmark Society have restrictive covenants.

Notable properties 

Ellen E. Ward Memorial Clock Tower (in Roslyn)
George W. Denton House (in Flower Hill)
Henry Western Eastman Tennant Cottage (in Roslyn)
 Mackay Estate Dairyman's Cottage (in East Hills)
 Mackay Estate Gate Lodge (in East Hills)
 Mackay Estate Water Tower (in East Hills)
Roslyn House (in Roslyn Heights)
 Roslyn National Bank and Trust Building (in Roslyn)
 Roslyn Savings Bank Headquarters (in Roslyn)

See also 

 List of historical societies

References

External links 

 Official website
Roslyn, New York
Historical societies in New York (state)